Oleksiy Yuriyovych Kucherenko (born April 3, 1961) is a Ukrainian politician. He was Minister of Housing and Communal Services from 2007 to 2010. Kucherenko previously served as Governor of Zaporizhzhia Oblast from 2000 to 2001.

Biography
Kucherenko was a Member of Ukrainian parliament (Verkhovna Rada) of III (he won a seat in constituency number 80 located in Zaporizhia Oblast as a self-nominated candidate), V (as a candidate of the Our Ukraine Bloc), VI convocation (as a candidate for the Our Ukraine–People's Self-Defense Bloc). The following election, the 2014 Ukrainian parliamentary election, Kucherenko failed as a candidate for the Petro Poroshenko Bloc to win a parliamentary seat in constituency 216 located in Kyiv, he lost by a small margin of 100 votes. In the 2019 Ukrainian parliamentary election he returned to parliament for Batkivshchyna.

He is a Candidate of Sciences (PhD) in sociological sciences.

Kucherenko was the candidate of Batkivshchyna for the post of Mayor of Kyiv in the 2020 Kyiv local election set for October 25, 2020. In the election he received 45,823 votes, securing fourth place but losing the election to incumbent Mayor Vitali Klitschko who was re-elected in the first round of the election with 50.52% of the votes, 365,161 people had voted for him.

References

External links
 Dovidka.com.ua

1961 births
Living people
Politicians from Vinnytsia
Taras Shevchenko National University of Kyiv alumni
National Academy of State Administration alumni
Governors of Zaporizhzhia Oblast
Third convocation members of the Verkhovna Rada
Fifth convocation members of the Verkhovna Rada
Sixth convocation members of the Verkhovna Rada
Ninth convocation members of the Verkhovna Rada
Communal living ministers of Ukraine
Our Ukraine (political party) politicians
Independent politicians of Batkivshchyna